Gastrointestinal physiology is the branch of human physiology that addresses the physical function of the gastrointestinal (GI) tract. The function of the GI tract is to process ingested food by mechanical and chemical means, extract nutrients and excrete waste products. The GI tract is composed of the alimentary canal, that runs from the mouth to the anus, as well as the associated glands, chemicals, hormones, and enzymes that assist in digestion. The major processes that occur in the GI tract are: motility, secretion, regulation, digestion and circulation. The proper function and coordination of these processes are vital for maintaining good health by providing for the effective digestion and uptake of nutrients.

Motility 

The gastrointestinal tract generates motility using smooth muscle subunits linked by gap junctions. These subunits fire spontaneously in either a tonic or a phasic fashion. Tonic contractions are those contractions that are maintained from several minutes up to hours at a time. These occur in the sphincters of the tract, as well as in the anterior stomach. The other type of contractions, called phasic contractions, consist of brief periods of both relaxation and contraction, occurring in the posterior stomach and the small intestine, and are carried out by the muscularis externa.

Motility may be overactive (hypermotility), leading to diarrhea or vomiting, or underactive (hypomotility), leading to constipation or vomiting; either may cause abdominal pain.

Stimulation 
The stimulation for these contractions likely originates in modified smooth muscle cells called interstitial cells of Cajal. These cells cause spontaneous cycles of slow wave potentials that can cause action potentials in smooth muscle cells. They are associated with the contractile smooth muscle via gap junctions.  These slow wave potentials must reach a threshold level for the action potential to occur, whereupon Ca2+ channels on the smooth muscle open and an action potential occurs. As the contraction is graded based upon how much Ca2+ enters the cell, the longer the duration of slow wave, the more action potentials occur. This, in turn, results in greater contraction force from the smooth muscle. Both amplitude and duration of the slow waves can be modified based upon the presence of neurotransmitters, hormones or other paracrine signaling. The number of slow wave potentials per minute varies based upon the location in the digestive tract. This number ranges from 3 waves/min in the stomach to 12 waves/min in the intestines.

Contraction patterns 

The patterns of GI contraction as a whole can be divided into two distinct patterns, peristalsis and segmentation. Occurring between meals, the migrating motor complex is a series of peristaltic wave cycles in distinct phases starting with relaxation, followed by an increasing level of activity to a peak level of peristaltic activity lasting for 5–15 minutes.
This cycle repeats every 1.5–2 hours but is interrupted by food ingestion. The role of this process is likely to clean excess bacteria and food from the digestive system.

Peristalsis 

Peristalsis is one of the patterns that occur during and shortly after a meal. The contractions occur in wave patterns traveling down short lengths of the GI tract from one section to the next. The contractions occur directly behind the bolus of food that is in the system, forcing it toward the anus into the next relaxed section of smooth muscle. This relaxed section then contracts, generating smooth forward movement of the bolus at between 2–25 cm per second. This contraction pattern depends upon hormones, paracrine signals, and the autonomic nervous system for proper regulation.

Segmentation 

Segmentation also occurs during and shortly after a meal within short lengths in segmented or random patterns along the intestine. This process is carried out by the longitudinal muscles relaxing while circular muscles contract at alternating sections thereby mixing the food. This mixing allows food and digestive enzymes to maintain a uniform composition, as well as to ensure contact with the epithelium for proper absorption.

Secretion 

Every day, seven liters of fluid are secreted by the digestive system. This fluid is composed of four primary components: ions, digestive enzymes, mucus, and bile. About half of these fluids are secreted by the salivary glands, pancreas, and liver, which compose the accessory organs and glands of the digestive system. The rest of the fluid is secreted by the GI epithelial cells.

Ions

The largest component of secreted fluids is ions and water, which are first secreted and then reabsorbed along the tract. The ions secreted primarily consist of H+, K+, Cl−, HCO3− and Na+. Water follows the movement of these ions. The GI tract accomplishes this ion pumping using a system of proteins that are capable of active transport, facilitated diffusion and open channel ion movement. The arrangement of these proteins on the apical and basolateral sides of the epithelium determines the net movement of ions and water in the tract.

H+ and Cl− are secreted by the parietal cells into the lumen of the stomach creating acidic conditions with a low pH of 1. H+ is pumped into the stomach by exchanging it with K+. This process also requires ATP as a source of energy; however, Cl− then follows the positive charge in the H+ through an open apical channel protein.

HCO3− secretion occurs to neutralize the acid secretions that make their way into the duodenum of the small intestine. Most of the HCO3− comes from pancreatic acinar cells in the form of NaHCO3 in an aqueous solution. This is the result of the high concentration of both HCO3− and Na+ present in the duct creating an osmotic gradient to which the water follows.

Digestive enzymes 

The second vital secretion of the GI tract is that of digestive enzymes that are secreted in the mouth, stomach and intestines. Some of these enzymes are secreted by accessory digestive organs, while others are secreted by the epithelial cells of the stomach and intestine. While some of these enzymes remain embedded in the wall of the GI tract, others are secreted in an inactive proenzyme form. When these proenzymes reach the lumen of the tract, a factor specific to a particular proenzyme will activate it. A prime example of this is pepsin, which is secreted in the stomach by chief cells. Pepsin in its secreted form is inactive (pepsinogen). However, once it reaches the gastric lumen it becomes activated into pepsin by the high H+ concentration, becoming an enzyme vital to digestion. The release of the enzymes is regulated by neural, hormonal, or paracrine signals. However, in general, parasympathetic stimulation increases secretion of all digestive enzymes.

Mucus 

Mucus is released in the stomach and intestine, and serves to lubricate and protect the inner mucosa of the tract. It is composed of a specific family of glycoproteins termed mucins and is generally very viscous. Mucus is made by two types of specialized cells termed mucus cells in the stomach and goblet cells in the intestines. Signals for increased mucus release include parasympathetic innervations, immune system response and enteric nervous system messengers.

Bile 

Bile is secreted into the duodenum of the small intestine via the common bile duct. It is produced in liver cells and stored in the gall bladder until release during a meal. Bile is formed of three elements: bile salts, bilirubin and cholesterol. Bilirubin is a waste product of the breakdown of hemoglobin. The cholesterol present is secreted with the feces. The bile salt component is an active non-enzymatic substance that facilitates fat absorption by helping it to form an emulsion with water due to its amphoteric nature. These salts are formed in the hepatocytes from bile acids combined with an amino acid. Other compounds such as the waste products of drug degradation are also present in the bile.

Regulation 

The digestive system has a complex system of motility and secretion regulation which is vital for proper function. This task is accomplished via a system of long reflexes from the central nervous system (CNS), short reflexes from the enteric nervous system (ENS) and reflexes from GI peptides working in harmony with each other.

Long reflexes 

Long reflexes to the digestive system involve a sensory neuron sending information to the brain, which integrates the signal and then sends messages to the digestive system. While in some situations, the sensory information comes from the GI tract itself; in others, information is received from sources other than the GI tract. When the latter situation occurs, these reflexes are called feedforward reflexes. This type of reflex includes reactions to food or danger triggering effects in the GI tract. Emotional responses can also trigger GI response such as the butterflies in the stomach feeling when nervous. The feedforward and emotional reflexes of the GI tract are considered cephalic reflexes.

Short reflexes 

Control of the digestive system is also maintained by ENS, which can be thought of as a digestive brain that can help to regulate motility, secretion and growth. Sensory information from the digestive system can be received, integrated and acted upon by the enteric system alone. When this occurs, the reflex is called a short reflex. Although this may be the case in several situations, the ENS can also work in conjunction with the CNS; vagal afferents from the viscera are received by the medulla, efferents are affected by the vagus nerve. When this occurs, the reflex is called vagovagal reflex.  The myenteric plexus and submucosal plexus are both located in the gut wall and receive sensory signals from the lumen of the gut or the CNS.

Gastrointestinal peptides 

For further information see Gastrointestinal hormone

GI peptides are signal molecules that are released into the blood by the GI cells themselves. They act on a variety of tissues including the brain, digestive accessory organs, and the GI tract. The effects range from excitatory or inhibitory effects on motility and secretion to feelings of satiety or hunger when acting on the brain. These hormones fall into three major categories, the gastrin and secretin families, with the third composed of all the other hormones unlike those in the other two families. Further information on the GI peptides is summarized in the table below.

Digestion 
 carbohydrates (monosaccharide, disaccharide)
 proteins
 lipids

Splanchnic circulation 
 Superior mesenteric artery
 Inferior mesenteric artery

External links 
 Notes at University of Bristol

Notes and references 

Human physiology